Yilan County, alternately spelled I-lan, is a county in northeastern Taiwan, Republic of China.

Name

The name Yilan derives from the indigenous Kavalan people. Other former names in reference to this area in the Yilan Plain include Kabalan, Kavalan, Kavaland, kap-a-lan, Yiland and Gilan. Before 2009, the county's official name was transliterated as Ilan.

History

Early history

Since early ages, many people have traveled from far places to Yilan. Indigenous tribes that have settled in Yilan are Kavalan people and Atayal people.

The Kavalan people came by the sea and lived by the river at Yilan Plain since around 1,000 years ago. They mostly speak the Austronesian languages. Their settlements consisted of small villages along rivers with around 40-50 communities scattered around the area with a total population of approximately 10,000 people. The Atayal people came by crossing the Xiyuan Pass and settled in the mountain areas.

The Atayal people arrived in Yilan around 250 years ago and settled along the upper Dazhuoshui River. Later, the tribes crossed the Siyuan Pass to reach the valley upstream of the Zhuoshui River. These people are the current residents of Datong Township. Other parts of the Atayal people headed east to enter and settle along the Nan'ao North River and Heping North River. These groups are now settled in Nan-ao Township.

Around 200 years ago, at the end of the 18th century, the Han Chinese traversed the mountain range and settled in Yilan. Large populations began taming the wilderness, cultivating the fields and building irrigation channels. They used various means to seize lands from the Kavalans. Some Kavalans left their homes while some others migrated southwards to Hualien and Taitung coastlines and established settlements.

Spanish Formosa
The Spaniards began arriving in Taiwan in the 17th century. In 1626, the Spaniards led an invasion under the pretext of ship crews having been slain by Taiwanese barbarians. They then torched harbors and surrounding villages, and even went as far as taking over Su'ao Town and established a city called Saint Lorenzo.

Dutch Formosa
The Spaniards were subsequently ousted by the Dutch who had taken over the southern part of Taiwan and established Dutch Formosa. In 1640, the Dutch began contacting Han Chinese merchants for trade and levying taxes on various commercial goods. The merchants had to pay all company taxes but also enjoyed the right to monopolize trade.

Kingdom of Tungning
During the Kingdom of Tungning era, the previous economy monopoly system developed during the Dutch Formosa continued to be practiced.

Qing dynasty
When the Qing Dynasty annexed Taiwan, they established the Kavalan sub-prefecture in Yilan. In 1806, armed conflicts broke out among various ethnic immigrants, followed by pillaging by pirates. The Qing Dynasty government subsequently realized that if they continued to disregard the Kavalan people and did not establish rule of law and a system of defense, Yilan would become a haven for criminals and outlaws, a thorn in the side for Taiwan. In 1809, Jiaqing Emperor incorporated Kavalan into the domain of the empire. Troops were dispatched to quell pirate attacks and chart local territory.

Local government systems in Taiwan underwent many changes during the Qing Dynasty period. But with regards to administrative levels lower than the county, including local villages, there were no major changes. The earliest organization and planning of Yilan consisted of seven citadels. In 1835, the seven citadels were further divided into 12 citadels based on the needs of the changing population and environment. This arrangement remained unchanged until the end of Qing Dynasty rule.

After the Mudan Incident in 1874, Qing rulers changed their passive attitude and took a more ambitious approach in ruling Taiwan. The original aboriginal term Kavalan district was renamed with a more Han-centric Yilan name and the administrative system was also changed accordingly from the original temporary "district" to a formally governed "county". In 1875, the newly created Taipeh Prefecture included modern-day Yilan County.

Empire of Japan
After the First Sino-Japanese War in 1894, the Qing government handed over Taiwan to Japan in accordance with the Treaty of Shimonoseki.

Republic of China
After the handover of Taiwan from Japan to the Republic of China in October 1945, the present-day area of Yilan County was incorporated under Taipei County. On 10 October 1950, Yilan County was established as a county of Taiwan Province with Yilan City as the county seat.

Geography

Yilan County sits on the Yilan Plain, a combined alluvial plain created by Lanyang River and other minor streams with a rough shape of triangle. On the three vertices of the triangle sit the Toucheng, Sanxing and Su-ao Townships with a roughly equal distance of 30 km on the three sides. The Xueshan Range sits on the northwest of Yilan County from Toucheng to Sanxing. The county is geographically divided into the cliffs and the plains. The Central Mountain Range sits to the south from Sanxing to Su'ao.

The Upper Lanyang River is steep and the rapid current is highly erosive. Large amount of silt carried by the river have little time to settle because of the high slope of the lands where it flows out of the mountains and valleys. An alluvial fan is formed as a result of scattered sand and gravel settling down. Large amount of gravel accumulate in the shallow stream bed, creating alluvial fans that often forms into web-like pattern. The river tends to change courses after floods caused by heavy rainfall or river overflow. The Lanyang River slows down as it reaches mid and downstream where silt begins to settle.

Yilan County is located in the northeastern Taiwan Island which covers an area of 2,143 km2. The longest distance from east to west is 63 km and from north to south is 74 km. From the mountain areas downwards, the land falls in altitude in the stages of mountains, alleys, alluvial plains, lowlands, swamps, sand hills and finally coastline.

Yilan's Toucheng Township includes Guishan Island and Guiluan Island. The Senkaku Islands, known in Mandarin as the Diaoyu Islands, are claimed as part of the township.

Government

Yilan County is administered as a county of Taiwan Province. Yilan City is the county seat which houses the Yilan County Government and Yilan County Council. The county is headed by Magistrate Lin Zi-miao of the Kuomintang. Yilan is a sister city of Rockville, Maryland.

Elected magistrates
 Chen Ding-nan (1981-1989)
 Yu Shyi-kun (1989-1997)
 Liu Shou-cheng (1997-2005)
 Lu Kuo-hua (2005-2009)
 Lin Tsung-hsien (2009-2017)
 Wu Tze-cheng (2017)
 Chen Chin-te (2017-2018)
 Lin Zi-miao (2018)

Administrative divisions

Yilan County is divided into 1 city, 3 urban townships, 6 rural townships and 2 mountain indigenous townships.

Colors indicate the common language status of Formosan languages within each division.

Politics
Yilan County voted one Democratic Progressive Party legislator out of one seat to be in the Legislative Yuan during the 2016 Republic of China legislative election.

Sister City
Leawood, Kansas
https://leawood.org/

Demographics and culture

Population
Today Han Chinese comprises the majority of the population in Yilan County.

Education

Education related affairs in Yilan County is governed by the Education Department of Yilan County Government. The county houses several public and private universities and colleges such as the National Ilan University, National Lan-Yang Girls' Senior High school, National Yilan Senior High School, Lan Yang Institute of Technology and St. Mary's Medicine Nursing and Management College.

Energy
Yilan County has 40 MW renewable energy capacity from an incinerator plant and two hydroelectric power plants. It houses the Qingshui Geothermal Power Plant.

Sports
Yilan County was the host for the 2009 Asian Rowing Championships.

Tourist attractions

 Atayal Life Museum
 Guishan Island
 Jim and Dad's Brewery
 Erjie Rice Barn
 Jiuliao River Ecological Park
 Luodong Forestry Culture Park
 Su'ao Fortress
 Memorial Hall of Founding of Yilan Administration
 Northeast Coast National Scenic Area
 Jiaoxi Hot Springs
 Wufongci Scenic Area
 Kavalan Distillery
 Taiping Mountain
 Luodong Night Market
 National Center for Traditional Arts
 Spring Onion Culture Museum
 Changpi Lake
 Lee Rong-chun Literary Museum
 Old Dali Bridge
 Tofu Cape
 Yilan Brick Kiln
 Toucheng Leisure Farm
 Wufengqi Waterfall
 Wulaokeng Scenic Area
 Yilan Museum of Art
 Yilan Literary Museum
 Zhu Dayu Culture Museum
 Nantian Temple
 Kailu Xianfengye Temple
 Baitul Muslimin Mosque

Festivals
Yilan International Children's Folklore and Folkgame Festival, “A dreamland for the children of Taiwan, a magnet for art from around the world, a garden of culture for the people of Ilan.” Seven years ago, these were the concepts that launched the first ICFFF, and over the years the people of Yilan have been making it happen step by step. Of all Taiwan’s folk festivals, the ICFFF is probably the best known internationally.
Each summer, Dongshan River Water Park attracts countless children and the themes of the various years have become for many part of the collective memory. The number of people attending has grown each year since the festival was first held in 1996, surpassing one million visits for the first time in 2002. Not only does the event enrich Yilan's cultural soil and create business opportunities, it offers a highly successful example which other cities and counties across Taiwan can draw on as they also attempt to bring more culture and art into the life of their communities.
Started from 2004, Yilan Green International Film Festival (GIFT) is a non-competition film festival which launched its 3rd edition from 28/4 to 06/5, 2006. GIFT also aims to build up an archive collecting the selected works for the purposes of relevant research as well as education.
Yilan International Collegiate Invitational Regatta
Yilan Green Expo started from 2000. The Expo hold in spring every year and always locate on Wulaokeng, Su'ao. The spindle of Expo normally has three parts and there are agricultural life, ecological conservation, sustainable future. It attracts 300~400 thousand people every year in average.

Transportation

Rail
The Yilan Line and North-Link Line of Taiwan Railways Administration pass the county. Train stations within the two lines in the county are Shicheng, Dali, Daxi, Guishan, Wai-ao, Toucheng, Dingpu, Jiaoxi, Sicheng, Yilan, Erjie, Zhongli, Luodong, Dongshan, Xinma, Su'aoxin, Su'ao, Yongle, Dong-ao, Wuta and Hanben Station.

On 21 October 2018, it was the site of a train derailment that killed 18 passengers and injured 178.

Water
Harbors in the county include Wushi Harbor.

See also
 List of Taiwanese superlatives

Notes

Words in native languages

References

External links

ICFFF website 
NE Coast National Scenic Area website 
Wufongci Waterfall 
Yilan - A Natural Choice for Families

 
Taiwan placenames originating from Formosan languages